Saddhatissa may refer to 
Hammalawa Saddhatissa, (1914–1990) Sri Lankan Buddhist monk, missionary, writer and translator
Saddha Tissa of Anuradhapura, king of Anuradhapura from 137 to 119BCE

Sinhalese names